The Moordener Kill is a  tributary to the Hudson River that flows through southwestern Rensselaer County, New York, in the United States.

Moordener Kill translates to "Murderer Creek", with moordenaar being the modern Dutch word for "murderer" and kill for "creek". The name comes from the creek having been the site of an ambush of Dutch settlers by Native Americans in 1643 in which seven men and two women were killed.

See also
List of rivers of New York
Kieft's War

References

Tributaries of the Hudson River
Rivers of New York (state)
Rivers of Rensselaer County, New York